Alamo, Texas is a town located in Hidalgo County, Texas, U.S.A. 

Alamo, Texas may also refer to:

 Alamo Plaza Historic District, a historical district in downtown San Antonio, Texas
 Alamo Mission in San Antonio, former Spanish Catholic mission and now a museum 
 Battle of the Alamo, battle during the 19th-century Texas Revolution 
 Alamo Heights, Texas, an incorporated city in Bexar County
 The Alamo Colleges, a system of community colleges in the San Antonio vicinity